Alegre is a Spanish surname. Notable people with the surname include:
 Alibel Alegre (born 1983), Spanish figure skater
 Alona Alegre (born 1948), Filipino actress (Stage name)
 David Alegre (born 1984), Spanish field hockey player
 Derlis Alegre (born 1994), Paraguayan footballer
 Diego Alegre (born 1982), Spanish footballer
 Efraín Alegre (born 1963), Paraguayan politician
 Emma Alegre (born 1933), Filipino actress
 Esteban Alegre, Spanish Creole landowner and conquistador
 Johnny Alegre (born 1955), Filipino jazz musician
 Juan B. Alegre (born 1882), Philippine senator
 Manuel Alegre (born 1936), Portuguese poet and politician
 Mauricio Alegre (born 1975), Mexican footballer
 Mauro Alegre (born 1988), Argentine footballer
 Milton Alegre (born 1991), Argentine footballer
 Narciso Alegre (c. 1800s), Spanish general
 Narciso Alegre Pellicer (born 1866), Carlist exile to the Philippines
  Narciso J. Alegre (born 1911), Filipino civil liberties advocate
 Norberto Costa Alegre (born 1951), Prime Minister of São Tomé and Príncipe
 Oscar Alegre (born 1983), Argentine footballer
 Pedro Alegre (born 1961), Spanish sprint canoeist
 Ramón Alegre (born 1981), Spanish field hockey player
 Ricardo Alegre (born 1959), Mexican politician

Spanish-language surnames